Oxyopsis is a genus consisting of 11 species of mantises in the subfamily Vatinae.

See also
List of mantis genera and species

References

Stagmatopterinae
Mantodea genera